is a JR West Geibi Line station located in Koaza Yoshinaga, Ōaza Mita, Shiraki-chō, Asakita-ku, Hiroshima, Hiroshima Prefecture, Japan.

History
Kamimita Station was originally designed as a place for cars to stop, but with the gasoline rationing during World War II, the station was closed. After the war, the local citizens began a drive to reopen the station, and finally did so using privately raised funds. Because of this, the station is known for its story of "resurrection" through the efforts of the local residents.
1930-01-01: Mita Yoshinaga Station opens
1937-07-01: Station name changes to Kamimita Station
1942: Station closes.
1948-08-10: Kamimita Station reopens.
1987-04-01: Japan National Railways is privatized, and Kamimita Station becomes a JR West station

Station building and platforms
Kamimita Station features one raised platform capable of handling one line. The station building is a small wooden structure located down a short hill from the platform.

Environs
Kamimita Branch Post Office
Kawazu River
Misasa River

Highway access
 Hiroshima Prefectural Route 37 (Hiroshima-Miyoshi Route)

Connecting lines
All lines are JR West lines. 
Geibi Line
Commuter Liner/Local
Shiwaguchi Station — Kamimita Station — Nakamita Station

External links
 JR West

Railway stations in Hiroshima Prefecture
Geibi Line
Stations of West Japan Railway Company in Hiroshima city
Railway stations in Japan opened in 1930
Railway stations closed in 1942
Railway stations in Japan opened in 1948